This is a list of former artists who have recorded for Priority Records.

0–9
 415
 5th Ward Boyz
 504 Boyz

A
 Al Kapone
 Anotha Level
 Ant Banks
 Armored Saint

B
 Bad Azz
 Big Ed 
 Big L
 Big Mello
 Big Mike
 Big Moe
 Black Moon
 Blac Monks
 Black Star 
 Bobby Jimmy & The Critters
 Bongo Logic
 Boot Camp Clik
 Brotha Lynch Hung
 Bushwick Bill

C
 C-Murder
 The California Raisins
 Carole King
 Cheb Mami
 Choclair
 Choice
 Christopher Cross
 Christopher Franke
 CJ Mac 
 Cocoa Brovaz
 Company Flow
 The Comrads
 The Conscious Daughters
 Curtis Salgado
 Cutty Ranks
 Cypress Hill

D
 Da Lench Mob
 Dame Grease
 Daz Dillinger
 The Delinquents
 DJ Dara
 DJ Spinna
 DMG
 Dr. Dre

E
 E.S.G.
 Easy Mo Bee
 Eazy-E
 Edward II
 EPMD

F
 Fates Warning
 Fiend 
 Foreigner
 Full Blooded
 Funkadelic

G
 Gambino Family
 Ganksta NIP
 Gary B.B. Coleman
 Ghetto Commission 
 Get Low Playaz
 Geto Boys
 Goo Goo Dolls
 Grip Inc.
 Gwar
 Godhead (band)

H
 Heltah Skeltah
 The High & Mighty
 Hi-Tek

I
 Ice Cube
 Ice-T
 The Itals

J
 Jay-Z
 Johnny Clegg & Savuka
 JT The Bigga Figga
 Juluka

K
 Kane & Abel
 Killarmy

L
 Lil Italy
 Lil' Romeo
 Lil Soldiers
 Lil' Zane
 Low Profile

M
 Mac
 Magic
 Magnapop
 Mark May
 Master P
 MC Ren
 The Memphis Horns
 Mercedes
 Mercyful Fate
 Mia X
 Michel'le
 Mo B. Dick
 Mos Def
 Mr. Marcelo
 Mr. Mike
 Mr. Serv-On

N
N.W.A
 Nice & Smooth
 No Good But So Good

O
 O.G. Style
 Odd Squad
 Organized Konfusion
 Originoo Gunn Clappaz
 Ozzy Osbourne

P
 Paris
 Pauly Shore
 Pharoahe Monch
 Prime Suspects

R
 Ras Kass
Ray Luv

S
 Sam Kinison
 San Quinn
 Sauce Money
 Sarina Paris
 Scarface
 Seagram
 Silkk The Shocker
 Shyheim
 Skrew
 Skull Duggery
 Smut Peddlers
 Snoop Dogg
 Sons of Elvis
 Sons of Funk
 Soulja Slim
 Steady Mobb'n
 Stephen Simmonds
 Svala

T
 Tha Dogg Pound
 Too Much Trouble
 Trinity Garden Cartel
 TRU

U
 U-God

W
 WC and the Maad Circle
 Westside Connection
 Wu-Syndicate
 Wu-Tang Killa Bees

Y
 Y&T
 Young Bleed

References

 
Priority Records, former